Cheat on Me If You Can is a South Korean television series starring Cho Yeo-jeong, Go Jun, Yeonwoo, Kim Young-dae and Kim Ye-won. The series directed by Kim Hyung-seok and written by Lee Seong-min follows an unconventional and intense story about Kang Yeo-joo, a novelist who wrote a memorandum to her husband Han Woo-sung, a divorce lawyer, stating, "If You Cheat, You Die". It aired on KBS2 from December 2, 2020 to January 28, 2021 on Wednesdays and Thursdays at 21:30 (KST) time slot.

Synopsis
A comical mystery thriller between a divorce lawyer and his wife, a criminal novelist who only thinks about how to kill people. She wrote a memorandum stating, "If you cheat, you die".

Cast

Main
  Cho Yeo-jeong as Kang Yeo-joo, author of a few best-selling mystery novels, known for her writing style. She usually ends her stories by finishing off her immoral male characters for being unfaithful. So she is dubbed the "Praying Mantis".
  Go Jun as Han Woo-sung, husband of Yeo-joo, a divorce lawyer who is passionate and emotionally involved with his job.
  Kim Young-dae as Cha Soo-ho, a part-time worker at a convenience store, who is actually an agent of the National Intelligence Service.
  Yeonwoo as Go Mi-rae, a college student who looks innocent but deep inside, carries a complicated personality.

Supporting

People around Yeo-joo and Woo-sung 
  Song Ok-sook as Yeom Jin-ok, a professional house-keeper working at Yeo-joo and Woo-sung's house
  Na Young-hee as Han Woo-sung's mother
  Jung Sang-hoon as Son Jin-ho, Han Woo-sung's best friend and secretary of the lawyer's office.
 Lee Se-na as Min Yoon-hui, Jin-ho's wife
 Kim Ji-hoon as Son Dong-ho, Jin-ho's son

Seodong Police Station 
 Lee Si-eon as Jang Seung-chul, an experienced homicide detective
Kim Ye-won as Ahn Se-jin, the only female detective in the violent crimes department
 Lee Tae-hyung as Hong Sung-wan, team leader

Broadcast stations 
 Hong Soo-hyun as Baek Soo-jung
 Gong Sang-ah as Oh Hyun-jung, the PD in-charge of the morning information program
 Yoo Jun-hong as Kim Deok-gi, Baek Soo-jeong's manager

The O Ville Publishing Company 
 Kim Soo-jin as Yang Jin-sun, a representative of the publishing House
  Song Seung-ha as Na Yoo-ri

Others 
 Oh Min-suk as Ma Dong-kyun, Director of the National Intelligence Service
 Bae Noo-ri as Eom Ji-eun, NIS agent 
 Kim Do-hyun as Nam Gi-ryong, Korea's leading political consultant
 Han Soo-yeon as Park Hye-kyeong, Woo-sung's rival lawyer
 Choi Jung-woo as Go Mi-rae's friend	
 Jeon Soo-kyeong as Yoon Hyeong-suk, Kang Yeo-joo's step-mother
 Yoo So-young as Jogger
 Kim Jeong-pal as Bae Jung-shik, the apartment manager
 Kim Gwang-sub as Green Ivy member

Production
The series, also known as You Cheat, You Die, You're Dead If You Cheat, and If I Cheat, I Die, is directed by Kim Hyoung-seok and written by Lee Sung-min. In July 2020, Go Jun was confirmed to play the lead role. Bae Noo-ri was confirmed in August 2020. The first reading of the script was held in August 2020.

On August 22, KBS announced that in an emergency meeting they decided to stop production. The filming of the series would stop to prevent the cast and crew become infected with the pandemic of COVID-19, as new outbreaks of the disease were reported. On October 13, first look poster and first air date was officially announced. The drama's first poster apparently purported to show an important clue, as it shows a document inside a plastic bag taped shut at the scene of a crime. The document is stained with blood and reads, "If Han Woo-sung has an affair with another person after he has married Kang Yeo-joo, Kang Yeo-joo will have all the rights to Han Woo-sung's body."

Episode 8 did not air on Thursday, December 24, 2020 to allow the airing of the 2020 KBS Entertainment Awards.

Episode 9 did not air on Thursday, December 31, 2020 to allow the airing of the 2020 KBS Drama Awards. It aired on Wednesday, January 6, 2021.

Original soundtrack

Part 1

Part 2

Part 3

Viewership
According to Nielsen Korea the first episode of the series recorded 5.8% average audience viewership nationwide and 6.2% in metropolitan area. It ranked first among Wednesday and Thursday dramas.

Awards and nominations

References

External links
  
 Cheat on Me If You Can at Daum 
 
 
 

Korean Broadcasting System television dramas
2020 South Korean television series debuts
2021 South Korean television series endings
Korean-language television shows
South Korean romantic comedy television series
South Korean thriller television series
Television productions postponed due to the COVID-19 pandemic
Television series by AStory
Wavve original programming